Plashett Park Wood is a  biological Site of Special Scientific Interest between Lewes and Uckfield in East Sussex.

This ancient wood has an extensive area of rides. There are several rare plants, such as the spiked rampion and 25 species of butterfly, including the pearl bordered fritillary, purple hairstreak and silver-washed fritillary. There are also 67 species of breeding birds.

References

Sites of Special Scientific Interest in East Sussex
Ringmer
Little Horsted